Stade Michel d'Ornano is a multi-use stadium in Caen, France. It is currently used mostly for football matches and is the home stadium of Stade Malherbe Caen. It is named after the French politician Michel d'Ornano (1924–1991), former president of the Basse-Normandie region.

The stadium was built in 1993 to replace the Stade de Venoix, and has a capacity of 20,300 people.

International matches
France national football team played twice in this stadium:
  France 3–1  (28 July 1993)
  France 2–0  (15 November 1995)

France national under-21 football team also played in this stadium during the qualifications for the European Championship:
  France 1–1 Israel  (7 October 2006)
  France 5–0 Kazakhstan  (5 September 2013)

Attendances
The average attendance largely depends on results of Stade Malherbe Caen. Matches are regularly sold out when the club plays in Ligue 1, and average attendance is around  when SM Caen competes in second division.

References

Stade Malherbe Caen
Michel d'Ornano
Buildings and structures in Caen
Sports venues in Calvados (department)
Sports venues completed in 1993